Knight Mare is the third EP by the band 12012, released on November 3, 2004, being the second release of a three-month release campaign.

Track listing 
 "Nightmare" - 00:43
 "Shinsoku" (浸色) - 4:23
 "Aren't you Dead Yet?" - 4:36
 "Sheep" - 5:39
 "Hai Oru Karada" (灰降ル躰) - 5:40

Notes
Knight Mare was reissued in 2006, along with Bell Salem and Shin -Deep-
Only 3000 copies of the album were pressed.

12012 albums
2004 EPs